St Mary's Church is a Grade I listed Anglican church in Tickhill, South Yorkshire, England. Dating from the early 12th century and built with local Magnesian Limestone the structure today is predominantly of Perpendicular style with glimpses of earlier Norman, Early English and Decorated styles. It is an active place of worship in the Diocese of Sheffield.

Organ 

The organ was originally built in 1857 by Charles Brindley (Sheffield). One of his earliest organs, the influence of Edmund Schulze - whom Brindley met at the Great Exhibition of 1851 - is clear notably in the complete Diapason chorus of the Great.

The current organ is the result of several major rebuilds and regular additions. Its most recent additions are the Pedal Double Trumpet 16'; which was added in 2007, and a protective canopy; added in 2010.

Peal

See also
Grade I listed buildings in South Yorkshire
Listed buildings in Tickhill

References

External links

Church of England church buildings in South Yorkshire
Grade I listed churches in South Yorkshire
Saint Mary's Church